Mongolia competed at the 1980 Summer Olympics in Moscow, USSR. 43 competitors, 39 men and 4 women, took part in 41 events in 8 sports.

Medalists

Silver

 Tsendiin Damdin — Judo, Men's Half Lightweight (65 kg)  
 Jamtsyn Davaajav — Wrestling, Men's Freestyle Welterweight

Bronze
 Ravdangiin Davaadalai — Judo, Men's Lightweight (71 kg)
 Dugarsürengiin Oyuunbold — Wrestling, Men's Freestyle Bantamweight

Archery

In the third time they competed in archery at the Olympics, Mongolia entered two men and two women.  Both of the men were returning veterans from the 1976 games while both of the women were Olympic rookies.  The men both improved upon their scores and ranks from four years before.

Women's Individual Competition:
 Chagdar Biambasuren — 2216 (→ 23rd place)
 Tsedendorj Bazarsuren — 2112 (→ 29th place)

Men's Individual Competition:
 Niamtseren Biambasuren — 2361 points (→ 19th place)
 Tserendorjin Dagvadorj — 2318 points (→ 23rd place)

Boxing

Men's Light Flyweight (– 48 kg)
 Vandui Bayasgalan
 First Round — Lost to Gilberto Sosa (Mexico) on points (1-4)

Men's Flyweight (– 51 kg)
 Nyama Narantuya
 First Round — Lost to Ramon Armando Guevara (Venezuela) on points (0-5)

Men's Bantamweight (– 54 kg)
 Tseden Narmandakh
 First Round — Bye
 Second Round — Lost to Joseph Ahanda (Cameroon) after referee stopped contest in third round

Men's Featherweight (– 57 kg)
 Ravsal Otgonbayar
First Round — Defeated Abdulzhava Jawad Ali (Iraq) on points (4-1)
 Second Round — Lost to Carlos González (Mexico) on points (2-3)

Men's Lightweight (– 60 kg)
 Galsandorj Batbileg
 First Round — Defeated Alberto Mendes Coelho (Angola) on points (5-0)
 Second Round — Defeated Jesper Garnell (Denmark) on points (4-1)
 Quarter Finals — Lost to Angel Herrera (Cuba) on points (0-5)

Men's Light-Welterweight (– 63,5 kg)
 Khast Jamgan
 First Round — Bye
 Second Round — Lost to William Lyimo (Tanzania) on points (0-5)

Cycling

Five cyclists represented Mongolia in 1980.

Individual road race
 Luvsandagvyn Jargalsaikhan
 Batsükhiin Khayankhyarvaa
 Dorjpalamyn Tsolmon
 Dashjamtsyn Tömörbaatar

Team time trial
 Luvsandagvyn Jargalsaikhan
 Batsükhiin Khayankhyarvaa
 Damdinsürengiin Orgodol
 Dashjamtsyn Tömörbaatar

Gymnastics

Judo

Shooting

Weightlifting

Wrestling

References

External links
Official Olympic Reports
International Olympic Committee results database

Nations at the 1980 Summer Olympics
1980 Summer Olympics
Oly